Tomás Cruz Martínez (born 21 December 1959) is a Mexican politician affiliated with the Party of the Democratic Revolution. As of 2014 he served as Deputy of the LIX Legislature of the Mexican Congress as a plurinominal representative.

References

1959 births
Living people
Politicians from the State of Mexico
Members of the Chamber of Deputies (Mexico)
Party of the Democratic Revolution politicians
Deputies of the LIX Legislature of Mexico